Armenians in the Ottoman Empire include:

Abraham Pasha, civil servant and diplomat 
Güllü Agop, actor, founder of modern Turkish theatre
Aram Andonian, journalist
Arpiar Arpiarian, writer
Krikor Balakian, bishop
Balyan family, architects
Hagop Baronian, writer, satirist
Nazaret Daghavarian, doctor
Ohan Demirgian, diplomat
Armen Dorian, poet, teacher, editor
Tatyos Efendi, composer, violinist
Erukhan, writer
Calouste Gulbenkian, businessman, philanthropist
Bedros Kapamajian, mayor of Van (assassinated by Dashnaks)
Verkine Karakaschian (1856–1933), actress and soprano
Yeranuhi Karakashian (1848–1924), actress
Varaztad Kazanjian, prominent oral and maxillofacial surgeon
Hagop Kazazian Pasha, minister of finance
Diran Kelekian, journalist, professor
Mkrtich Khrimian, religious leader, writer
Mekhitar of Sebaste, scholar, theologian
Mıgırdiç Mıgıryan, athlete (participated in the 1912 Olympics)
Yervant Odian, writer, satirist
Vahram Papazian, actor
Vahram Papazyan (athlete), athlete (participated in the 1912 Olympics)
Vartan Pasha, statesman, author
Karekin Pastermadjian, aka Armen Garo, political activist
Ruben Sevak, writer
Levon Shant, playwright, writer
Siamanto, writer
Papken Siuni, political activist
Bîmen Şen, composer
Koharik Şirinyan (1860 – ?), stage actress and soprano
Bedros Tourian, poet
Komitas Vardapet, musician
Daniel Varujan, poet
Rupen Zartarian, writer, educator
Krikor Zohrab, statesman, author

See also
List of Turkish Armenians
Ottoman Armenian population

Armenians
Ottoman
Armenian